In electric grid power generators, curtailment is the deliberate reduction in output below what could have been produced in order to balance energy supply and demand or due to transmission constraints. The definition is not strict, and several types of curtailment exist. "Economic dispatch" (low market price) is the most common.

Curtailment is a loss of potentially useful energy, and may impact power purchase agreements. However, utilizing all available energy may require costly methods such as building new power lines or storage, becoming more expensive than letting surplus power go unused.

Examples
After ERCOT built a new transmission line from the Competitive Renewable Energy Zone in West Texas to the central cities in the Texas Interconnection in 2013, curtailment was reduced from 8-16% to near zero.

Curtailment of wind power in western China was around 20% in 2018.

In 2018, curtailment in the California grid was 460 GWh, or 0.2% of generation. Curtailment has since increased to 150-300 GWh/month in spring of 2020 and 2021, mainly solar power at noon as part of the duck curve.

In Hawaii, curtailment reached 20% on the island of Maui in Hawaii in the second and third quarters of 2020.

Mitigation options
Transmission upgrade
Demand response
Battery storage power station
Energy forecasting, including forecasting for price, wind and solar

References

External links
 Increase in curtailment in California, 2014—2022 
 Curtailment curves in South Australia, peaking at 69% (Christmas 2021) 

Electrical engineering